Michael Edward Hopkinson (born 24 February 1942) is an English former footballer who played at full-back for Derby County, Mansfield Town, Port Vale, Boston United, and Belper Town. He had a 12-year career in the Football League, making 174 league appearances.

Career
Hopkinson began his career with Derby County, who finished the 1959–60 season in 18th place in the Second Division under the stewardship of Harry Storer. The "Rams" finished 12th in 1960–61 and 16th in 1961–62, before new boss Tim Ward took them to 18th in 1962–63, 13th in 1963–64, ninth in 1964–65, eighth in 1965–66, and 17th in 1966–67. He left Derby after new manager Brian Clough led County to 18th place in 1967–68. He scored four goals in 115 league appearances during his time at the Baseball Ground. Hopkinson then transferred to Tommy Eggleston's Mansfield Town, who finished 15th in the Third Division in 1968–69 and then sixth in 1969–70. He scored one goal in 46 league games at Field Mill. He signed with Gordon Lee's Port Vale in July 1970. He played 13 Third Division games in the 1970–71 season. He left Vale Park on a free transfer in May 1971 and moved on to Boston United, Belper Town (as player-coach and later as manager), before becoming the coach and assistant manager at Burton Albion.

Career statistics

References

People from Amber Valley
Footballers from Derbyshire
English footballers
Association football fullbacks
Derby County F.C. players
Mansfield Town F.C. players
Port Vale F.C. players
Boston United F.C. players
Belper Town F.C. players
English Football League players
Northern Premier League players
English football managers
Association football coaches
Burton Albion F.C. non-playing staff
1942 births
Living people